Frank C. Snyder  (1872 – March 9, 1917) was a Major League Baseball catcher. He played for the 1898 Louisville Colonels.

Sources

1872 births
1917 deaths
Baseball players from Toronto
19th-century baseball players
Canadian expatriate baseball players in the United States
Jacksonville Jacks players
London Cockneys players
Louisville Colonels players
Major League Baseball catchers
Major League Baseball players from Canada
St. Joseph Saints players
Toronto Canucks players
St. Thomas Saints players
Reading Coal Heavers players